Punctapinella viridargentea is a species of moth of the family Tortricidae. It is found in Tungurahua Province, Ecuador.

The wingspan is 19.5 mm. The ground colour of the forewings is silver white, strigulated (finely streaked) with greenish olive with rows of scales. The terminal area is suffused with brownish and the markings are dark grey, spotted with blackish. The hindwings are white, tinged with pale brownish.

Etymology
The species name refers to the colouration of the forewings and is derived from Latin viridis (meaning green) and argentens (meaning silver).

References

Moths described in 2009
Euliini